Khirala — A village in the Pandhana tahsll about 16 miles south of Khandwa and a mile from Borgaon on the Sukta river.
Population (1901 ) 1243. The village contains an old mosque and a Muhammadan tomb. There are a number of Muhammadan dyers here who dye and print red cloths and are called Sindhis because they are supposed to have come from Sind. The village is owned by a Maratha Brahman widow, who is hopelessly involved in debt.

Khirala also commonly referred to as Khirala Sharif is a village in Pandhana tehsil in the Khandwa district (previously known as East Nimar) of Madhya Pradesh, India. It belongs to the Indore division.

Tomb
The village houses the tomb of Haji Sayyed Mohammed Badiuddin zia-ul-haq Qadri Shattari, Dargah of a Sufi from Madhya Pradesh. The Urs of Haji Sayyed Mohammed Badiuddin zia-ul-haq Qadri Shattari at Dargah Sharif in Khirala attracts thousands of visitors every year.

References

Villages in Khandwa district